Thora Silverthorne (25 November 1910 – 17 January 1999), also known as "Red Silverthorne", was a British Communist, healthcare activist, and a nanny for Somerville Hastings, and former president of the Socialist Medical Association (SMA). She is most known for her service to the International Brigades during the Spanish Civil War, and for her roles in helping to found both Britain's National Health Service (NHS), and co-founding Britain's first union for rank and file nurses.

Silverthorne was a life-long member of the Communist Party of Great Britain (CPGB).

Early life 
Silverthorne was born into a working-class mining family in Abertillery, Wales. Her father George Silverthorne was an early recruit to the CPGB, an active member of the South Wales Mines Federation, and a worker at the Six Bells Colliery. She grew up in Abertillery and was one of many children belonging to Sarah Boyt. When Silverthorne's mother died in August 1927,  she and her family relocated to Reading, Berkshire.

She joined the Young Communist League at the age of 16 during the 1926 United Kingdom general strike, and soon afterwards was seen chairing meetings with the communist trade union leader Arthur Horner, and later joined the CPGB. Although she was also a member of the UK Labour party, she remained a lifelong member of the CPGB. During her teenage years in Reading, Silverthorne supported herself by selling the Daily Worker to railway staff, and she worked as a Nanny for Reading Labour Party MP and founder of the Socialist Medical Association (SMA), Somerville Hastings. Hastings was known to have supported Silverthorne's ambition to become a nurse. In March 1931, Silverthorne started training as a nurse at the Radcliffe Infirmary in Oxford, where her older sister Olive was already working as a nurse.  She volunteered as a nurse for Lancashire hunger marchers passing through Oxford during the National Hunger March, and was prone to "helping herself to bandages and dressings" from the wards of the Radcliffe Infirmary. During her time in Oxford, she was given the nickname "Red Silverthorne" for her communist activities, and would also become friends with the Marxist historian Christopher Hill who she met through the Oxford communist society known as the October Club.

Participation in the Spanish Civil War 
In October 1934, Silverthorne left Oxford and completed her medical training in London, and by 1936 she had taken her first post at the Hammersmith Hospital where she met founding member of the Spanish Medical Aid Committee (SMAC), Dr Charles Wortham Brook. That same year she joined SMAC, a decision which she described as 'the prime and best and most important decision I've made in my life'. In October 1936, she travelled to Spain alongside photographer Alec Wainman as part of the British Medical Unit, the first-ever foreign medical unit from any country to travel to Spain and serve the Spanish republican government. After arriving in Spain, she was involved in the creation of the first British hospital in Spain during the Spanish Civil War, established near Grañén. She was later elected the chief nurse and matron of this same hospital. British International Brigadier Michael Livesey died of his injuries while in the Silverthorne's arms, a memory which haunted her for the rest of her life. During her time in Spain, she met Kenneth Sinclair-Loutit, whom she would marry during the war in 1937.  Silverthorne worked closely alongside Doctor Archie Cochrane, who praised her for her professional expertise in medicine.

After SIlverthorne's death in 1999, declassified British archives showed that she was being closely monitored by British government spies, who had intercepted her mail and monitored her telephone.

Later and professional life 
She returned to Britain in September 1937, where she lived in a flat in London's Great Ormond Street. According to historian Liz Woolley, Silverthorne "went on to have a distinguished career which changed the nursing profession to a remarkable degree", and also became the sub-editor for Nursing Illustrated. Deeply influenced by her experiences in Spain, she made it her "life work" to improve the pay, conditions and professional standing of British nurses.

With the help of communist nurses, she and activist Nancy Blackburn co-founded the National Nurses Association, the first trade union that represented ordinary rank and file nurses. This nurses union gained significant attention from the British press, which it used to highlight the poor pay and working conditions of British nurses. In response to her socialist beliefs and the radical politics of the National Nurses Association, the Royal College of Nursing attacked Silverthorne for allegedly “not being a registered nurse” and by also claiming that she was “paid by Moscow”. Silverthorne became the Organising Secretary of the Socialist Medical Association (SMA) in July 1942, making her their first employee.  As the Secretary of the SMA, she led a delegation that met Clement Attlee to discuss the establishment of the National Health Service. She was a full-time union official of the Civil Service Clerical Association until she retired in 1970.

Silverthorne was chosen to greet Pablo Picasso during a visit to the UK.

Thora Silverthorne died in London in January 1999 and was commemorated with a funeral in Marylebone cemetery. During the funeral, the Welsh hymn Land of My Fathers, as performed in English by Paul Robeson, was played during the service. In 2022 she was honoured with a Purple Plaque in Abertillery.

Personal life
After returning from Spain with her new husband Kenneth Sinclair-Loutit (whom she married in 1937), they lived together at 12 Great Ormond Street. Later in life she would divorce Kenneth Sinclair-Loutit and marry the architect Cameron Nares Craig.  She had one son and two daughters.

She was also a friend of Arthur Horner, Clive Jenkins, and Frank Cousins.

See also 

 Charlie Hutchison
 Ralph Winston Fox
 Bill Alexander
 GCT Giles
 British Battalion
 Communist Party of Great Britain

References

British nurses
1910 births
1999 deaths
Communist Party of Great Britain members
British trade unionists